"Swing" is a song written by Chris Stapleton and Frank Rogers, and recorded by American country music artist Trace Adkins.  It was released in May 2006 as the first single from his album Dangerous Man.

Content 

The song uses a typical baseball batting practice to set up a woman's night at a tavern, and several men's attempts to pick her up. The first man "strikes out" using cheap pick-up lines, such as "what's your sign?".  The second lies about his background (claiming he attended Harvard University as a pre-med major) and reaches first but then tells her he quit because it was too hard, thus getting "picked off". Finally, the third man "hits a home run" successfully gaining the woman's interest and leaves the bar with her.

Critical reception 

Allmusic reviewed "Swing" as "glossy and anthemic." Kevin John Coyne of Country Universe called the song "a train wreck."

Music video 

The music video was directed by Michael Salomon and premiered in June 2006.  The video depicts a baseball team's practice.  The team can't get one batter to hit against the pitcher, who is a self-centered egomaniac and thinks he is God's gift to women. The crowd of fans starts to leave when the groundskeeper (Trace Adkins) steps up to the plate and asks for a pitch. The pitcher is more than happy to oblige, as he had just managed to strike out the whole team.  The groundskeeper is successful hitting a home run on a fastball and runs the bases, all the time making fun of the pitch. When crossing home, the girl jumps into his arms.

Chart performance 

The song debuted at number 47 on the U.S. Billboard Hot Country Songs chart for the week of May 13, 2006.

Certifications

References 

2006 singles
2006 songs
Trace Adkins songs
Capitol Records Nashville singles
Songs written by Chris Stapleton
Songs written by Frank Rogers (record producer)
Song recordings produced by Frank Rogers (record producer)
Music videos directed by Michael Salomon